The 2013 Metro Atlantic Athletic Conference men's basketball tournament was held March 8–11 at the MassMutual Center in Springfield, Massachusetts.  The tournament was held in Springfield through 2014. Iona defeated Manhattan in the championship game to win the tournament and an automatic bid into the 2013 NCAA tournament.

Bracket
 
 

All times listed are Eastern

References

MAAC men's basketball tournament
Basketball in Springfield, Massachusetts
2012–13 Metro Atlantic Athletic Conference men's basketball season
MAAC Men's Basketball
Basketball competitions in Massachusetts
21st century in Springfield, Massachusetts
College sports tournaments in Massachusetts